Lipitsa culture (Romanian Lipița, Polish Lipica, German: Lipitza) is the archaeological material culture supposedly representative of a Dacian tribe. It took its name from the Ukrainian village of Verkhnya Lypytsya, Ivano-Frankivsk Raion, Ivano-Frankivsk Oblast.

Geography
 
It is located on the Upper Dniester   and Middle Dniester, Upper Prut, in the Carpathians and Subcarpathians of today’s Bukovina, Pokuttya, Galicia, Transcarpathia and Maramureş. It lasted from the middle of the 1st century BC to the beginning of the 3rd century AD.

Lipitsa type site

Smiszko (1932), Kostrzewski (1949), Sulimirski (1972), Cigilik (1975), Kozak (1989 and 2006), Shchukin (1989 and 2006) explicitly assign to it a Dacian / North Thracian origin. Still in the early Roman period, this Thracian population was dominated by strong Celtic influences or had simply absorbed Celtic ethnic components   One of the most recent settlements on Dniester that is associated with Lipitsa culture is in Remezivtsi that existed before the early third century.

"Flat" cremation cemeteries are typical of this culture. And, along these a few graves have been discovered which differ markedly i.e. richly furnished inhumation burials in ancient mounds with equipment consisting of imported Roman vases and other goods, with a few articles typical of the Celtic culture. The pottery from these burials was a typical Lipitsa ware. Buried in the graves were evidently members of the ruling class of the Lipitsa culture, presumably of Celtic origin.

Like other pagan Dacians and Thracians, the Lipitsa people cremated their deceased. The remains were buried in a plane or tumular tomb. Only children were inhumed; as they hadn't passed a come of age passage ritual, due of their age, they couldn't be incinerated. These burial customs lasted from the late La Tène and were best preserved in the Upper Tisza basin, a region with a major Dacian cultural perpetuation throughout the ages.

The presence in Kolokolin (Ukraine, Ivano-Frankivsk Oblast) and Chizhikovo (Ukraine,  (Chyzhykove)) of Dacian pottery made some scholars to include also these memorials of those sites in the Lipitsa culture of the upper Dniester, which was as linked to it by the Dacian tribe of the Costoboci. Benadik and Kolnik sensing the similarity of these burials to the Zemplin burial ground, included the latter in the Lipitsa culture. However, these burials date from a slightly earlier period, and possess typological difference which makes their inclusion into the Lipitsa culture unlikely.

Culture and trade

Lipitsa culture is considered by the majority of scholars as representing the Dacian tribe of Costoboci.

Roman influences are also visible in the material culture. Likewise, Germanic people from the Przeworsk culture, but also Celts and Sarmatians, came in contact with the Lipitsa people. It seems that no Early Slavs made contact with this area yet, as the first Slavic artifacts in today's Moldavia and Bukovina are not dated earlier than the 5th and 6th centuries AD.

In the first decades of the 3rd century, Lipitsa culture of the Costoboci restricted its territory and gave birth to a new archaeological culture, that of the Carpathian Tumuli culture. A part of the Costoboci inhabiting the Subcarpathian hills withdrew southwards into the mountains, while a small part migrated in Moldavia, joining the Carpi, another Dacian tribe. In any case, some did remain in the northern area of the Lipitsa culture, despite the pressure of the newly arrived East Germanic tribes.

The largest part of the territory of Lipitsa and Carpathian Tumuli archaeological cultures is now inhabited by the Hutsuls, both in Ukraine and in Romania.

Notes

References
 Gheorghe Bichir, Dacii liberi din nordul Daciei in Spaţiul nord-est carpatic în mileniul întunecat, Historica, Iaşi, 1997
 
 Kostrzewski, Józef (1949) Les origines de la civilisation polonaise Press University of France
 
 Mircea Ignat, Spaţiul nord-est carpatic în secolele I - III d. Chr. in Spaţiul nord-est carpatic în mileniul întunecat, Historica, Iaşi, 1997
 Pe urmele strǎmoşilor uitaţi / vol. 1, 2 , 3, Fundaţia Baltagul, Cîmpulung Moldovenesc, 2003
 Parvan Vasile, Florescu Radu (1982) Getica, Editura Meridiane
 Shchukin Mark B (1989) Rome and the barbarians in central and eastern Europe: 1st century B.C.-1st century A.D.  British Archaeological Reports
 
 Shchukin Mark B, Kazanski Michel, Sharov Oleg (2006) Des les goths aux huns: le nord de la mer Noire au Bas-Empire et a l'époque des grandes migrations John and Erica Hedges, British Archaeological Reports (Jun 1 2006), 
 Spinei, Victor (1997) Bucovina în mileniul întunecat in Spaţiul nord-est carpatic în mileniul întunecat, Historica, Iaşi, 1997
 

Archaeological cultures of Eastern Europe
Archaeological cultures in Romania
Archaeological cultures in Ukraine
Dacian archaeology
Thracian archaeological cultures
Iron Age cultures of Europe
Archaeological cultures of Central Europe